The Boy's 400 metres hurdles at the 2011 World Youth Championships in Athletics was held at the Stadium Nord Lille Métropole on 6, 7 and 9 July.

Medalists

Records 
Prior to the competition, the following records were as follows.

During the competition, Egor Kuznetsov lowered the world youth leading to 50.97.

Heats 
Qualification rule: first 3 of each heat (Q) plus the 6 fastest times (q) qualified.

Heat 1

Heat 2

Heat 3

Heat 4

Heat 5

Heat 6

Semifinals 
Qualification rule: first 2 of each heat (Q) plus the 2 fastest times (q) qualified.

Heat 1

Heat 2

Heat 3

Final

References 

2011 World Youth Championships in Athletics